Francis is an English given name of Latin origin.

Francis is a name that has many derivatives in most European languages. The other version of the name in English is Frances, and (less commonly) Francine. (For most speakers, Francis and Frances are homophones or near homophones; a popular mnemonic for the spelling is "i for him and e for her".) The name Frank is a common diminutive for Francis, as is Frannie for Frances. Less common are the diminutives Fritz for Francis, and Franny and Fran for either Francis or Frances.

Derivation 
Francesco ("Frank", "Frenchman", "Free man" in medieval Italian) was the name given to Saint Francis of Assisi (born Giovanni di Pietro di Bernardone) by his francophile father, whose wife the mother of Francesco was French, celebrating his trade with French merchants. Due to the renown of the saint, this Italian name became widespread in Western Europe during the Middle Ages in different versions (Francisco, François, etc.). However, it was not regularly used in Britain until the 16th century as Francis.

The name of France itself comes from the Germanic people known as the Franks; the origin of their name is unclear but is thought to mean "free". The characteristic national weapon of the Franks was the francisca, a throwing axe.

Related names in other languages
Related names are common in other Western European languages, in countries that are (or were before the Reformation) Catholic. Other non-European languages have also adopted variants of the name. These names include:
 Arabic:  (Farānshiskū),  (Faransīs),  (Farānsīs)
 Aragonese: Francho
 Armenian: Ֆրանցիսկոս (Franciskos)
 Asturian: Xicu
 Albanian: Françesku
 Alemannic German: Franz, Fränzi
 Basque: Frantzisko, Frantziska, Patxi
 Bavarian: Franze, Franzi, Franzl
Belarusian: Francišak, Францішак (Frantsishak)
 Bulgarian:  (Frantsisk),  (Fruzhin)
 Breton: Franseza, Frañsez, Fañch, Fañchig, Soaig, Saig
 Catalan: Francesc, Cesc, Cesco, Xesc, Xisco, Fran (male version); Francesca, Cisca, Xisca, Xesca, Fani, Francina (female version)
 Chinese:  (Fúlǎngxīsī),  (Fāngjìgè),  (Fǎlánxīsī)
 Corsican: Francescu, Franciscu
 Croatian: Franjo, Frano, Frane, Fran (male version); Franciska, Franka, Franca, Franjica (female version)
 Czech: František, Františka (female version)
 Danish: Frans
 Dutch: Frans, Frank, Franciscus, Franciescus, Francieskus, Francis, Francies, Cies (Franciska, Francisca or Francien is used to signify the female version in the Netherlands)
 Esperanto: Francisko
 Estonian: Franciscus
 Filipino: Francisco, Francis, Franco, Kiko (diminutive of Francisco)
 Finnish: Frans, Fanni, Fransiscus, Ransu
 French: François, Francis, Francisque (rare) (male version); Françoise, France, Francine (female version)
 Galician: Francisco
 German: Franziskus, Franz, Franziska (female version)
 Greek: Fragiskos, Fragkiskos, Frangiskos, Frangkiskos, Frankiskos,, Frantzeskos, Frankiski, Frantzeska (female version)
 Gujarati:  (Phrānsis)
 Hawaiian: Palakiko
 Hindi:  (Phrānsis)
 Hungarian: Ferenc, Feri, Franciska (female version)
 Icelandic: Frans
 Indonesian: Fransiskus, Fransiska (female version)
 Irish: Proinsias, Proinnsias [Francie], (all variants are valid for both males & females, rare for a female to adopt this name in Irish)
 Italian: Francesco, Franco, Fran, Cino, Cisco, Cecco (male version); Franca, Francesca, Ciccia, Cina, Cesca, Cecca (female version)
 Japanese:  (Furanshisu) (for translation of English name),  (Furanshisuko) (for translation of Christian name)
 Kannada:  (Phrānsis)
 Konkani: Frask, Forso
 Korean:  (Peuransiseu),  (Peurancheseuko)
 Latin: Franciscus
 Latvian: Francisks, Francis
 Lithuanian: Pranciškus
 Lombard: Francesch
 Luo (Ke/Tz): Fransisko, Pransis
 Macedonian:  (Frensis)
 Malayalam:  (Porinchu/Porinju),  Pranchi, Prenju, Frenju (popular amongst the Syro Malabar Catholics of Kerala. Porinchu being more common in the North around the Thrissur ArchDiocese, while Prenju and Frenju are more common in the South in the Kuttanad region of the Changanacherry ArchDiocese)
 Maltese: Franġisk, Frans
 Manx: Frank
 Neapolitan: Francesco (diminutives: Ciccio, Ciccillo)
 Norman: Françouais
 Norwegian: Frans, Franciskus
 Occitan: Francés
 Persian:  (Frānsīs or Ferānsīs)
 Piedmontese: Fransesch
 Polish: Franciszek, (diminutives: Franek, Franio, Franuś) (male version), Franciszka, (diminutives: Franka, Frania) (female version)
 Portuguese: Francisco, Francisquinho, Chico, Chiquinho, Quico, Fran, Paco (diminutives) Francisca (female version), Francisquinha, Chica, Chiquinha, Quica (diminutives)
 Romanian: Francisc, Frâncu
 Russian:  (Franchesko) for Italians,  (Frantsisk) for popes,  (Frants) for Germans,  (Fransua) for French
 Samogitian: Prancėškos
 Sardinian: Franchiscu, Franciscu, Frantziscu (male version); Franchisca, Francisca, Frantzisca (female version); Tzitzeddu/Tzitzedda, Tzischeddu/Tzischedda, Ciccìttu/Ciccìtta (diminutives)
 Scottish Gaelic: Frangag, Frances, Francis
 Serbian: , Franja, Franc, Francisko (rare in native usage), Slobodan (local version)
 Sicilian: Franciscu, Ciscu
 Slovak: František
 Slovene: Frančišek, Franček, France, Franci, Franc, Fran, Franko
 Spanish: Francisco, Paco, Paquito, Curro, Fran, Quico, Pancho, Cisco, Chisco, Francisca (female version), Paca (female version),  Paqui or Paquita (female version)
 Swahili: Fransisko
 Swedish: Franciskus, Frans
 Tamil:  (Pirāṉcis)
 Telugu:  (Phrānsis)
 Thai:  (Frānsis̄)
 Turkish: Fransız, Fransuva
 Ukrainian:  (Frantsysk),  (Frantsyska, female version)
 Venetian: Francesco
 Vietnamese: Phanxicô
 Welsh: Fransis (or Fransys)
 West Frisian: Fransiskus
 Yiddish:  (Fransis)

List of people with the given name Francis 
 Francis Bacon (1561–1626), English philosopher, statesman, scientist, lawyer, jurist, author and pioneer of the scientific method
 Francis Bacon (artist) (1909–1992), Irish-born English artist
 Francis Baines (1648–1710), English Jesuit
Francis "Fritz" Barzilauskas (1920–1990), American National Football League player
 Francis Bernard (disambiguation), multiple people
 Francis Bohlen (1868–1942), American professor of law at the University of Pennsylvania Law School
 Francis Bouillon (born 1975), American-Canadian ice hockey player
 Francis S. Bowling (1916–1997), justice of the Supreme Court of Mississippi
 Francis Martin Patrick "Frankie" Boyle (born 1972), British stand-up comedian
 Francis Ford Coppola (born 1939), American film-director, producer, and screenwriter
 Francis Crick (1916–2004), British molecular biologist and winner of the 1962 Nobel Prize in Physiology or Medicine
 Francis E. Donoghue (1872–1952), member of Illinois State House of Representatives
 Francis Donald Logan (1930–2022), American historian
 Francis Drake (1540–1596), English sea captain
 Francis Elliott (journalist), British journalist
 Francis Scott Fitzgerald (1896–1940), American novelist and short story writer
 Francis B. Foley (1887–1973), American metallurgist
 Francis Fontaine (author) (1845–1901), American poet and novelist
 Francis Fukuyama (born 1952), American political scientist
 Francis C. Heitmeier (born 1950), American politician
 Francis Alick "Frankie" Howerd (1917–1992), British comedian and actor
 Francis Irving, British computer programmer and activist for freedom of information
 Francis Kobangoye (born 1990), Gabonese basketball player
 Francis Scott Key (1779–1843), writer of the American national anthem, "The Star-Spangled Banner"
 Francis Kilcoyne (died 1985), American President of Brooklyn College
 Francis Magalona (1964–2009), Filipino rapper, singer, songwriter, entrepreneur and television personality
 Francis J. McCaffrey (1917–1989), American lawyer and politician from The Bronx, New York
 Francis J. McCaffrey Jr. (1902–1972), American lawyer and politician from Brooklyn, New York
 Francis Marion, also known as the Swamp Fox, military officer in the American Revolutionary War
 Francis Maude, British Conservative politician
 Francis Davis Millet (1848–1912), American artist and RMS Titanic sinking victim
 Francis Molo (born 1994), New Zealand-Australian rugby league player
 Francis Ngannou (born 1986), Cameroonian-French mixed martial artist
 Francis Owen (1886–1975), Canadian philologist and military officer
 Francis Owusu (born 1994), American football player
 Francis "Frank" Pearson (1937–2003), British drag queen known as Foo Foo Lammar
 Francis Rosa (1920–2012), American sports journalist
 Francis Rossi (born 1949), British musician
 Francis Rundall (1908–1987), British diplomat
 Francis Saunderson (1754–1827), Anglo-Irish politician
 Francis Albert "Frank" Sinatra (1915–1998), American singer, actor, and producer
 Francis Valentino, American musician
 Francis Webb (disambiguation), multiple people
 Francis Parker Yockey, American writer, lawyer and philosopher
 Francis Zamora (born 1977), Filipino politician, businessman, and basketball player

Aristocracy
 Francis I, Holy Roman Emperor (1708–1765), also Francis III, Duke of Lorraine

France
 Francis I of France, King of France (1494–1547)
 Francis II of France, King of France (1544–1560)
 Francis I, Duke of Brittany (1414–1450)
 Francis II, Duke of Brittany (1433–1488)
 Francis III, Duke of Brittany (1518–1536)
 Francis I, Duke of Lorraine (1517–1545)
 Francis II, Duke of Lorraine (1572–1632)

German-speaking countries
 Francis II, Holy Roman Emperor, also Francis I, Emperor of Austria (1768–1835)
 Franz, Duke of Bavaria (born 1933), called "Francis II" by Jacobite supporters

Iberian monarchies
 Prince Francis Joseph of Braganza (1878–1919), Infante of Portugal, 2nd son of Miguel II, legitimist claimant to the throne of Portugal
 Francis of Spain (1822–1902), Duke of Cádiz, King Consort of Queen Isabella II

Italy
 Francis I of the Two Sicilies (1777–1830)
 Francis II of the Two Sicilies (1836–1894)
 Francis IV, Duke of Modena (1779–1846)
 Francis V, Duke of Modena (1819–1875)

Hungary
 Francis I Rákóczi, Prince of Transylvania (1645–1676)
 Francis II Rákóczi, Duke of Hungary and Prince Transylvania (1676–1735)

Scandinavia
 Francis of Denmark (1497–1511), Prince of Denmark, Norway and Sweden

Religious figures
 Pope Francis (born 1936), the current pope
 St. Francis of Assisi (1181/1182–1226), Italian Catholic friar and saint
 Francis de Sales (1567–1622), French Catholic bishop and saint
 Francis Xavier (1506–1552), Basque Catholic Jesuit missionary and saint
 Francis George, OMI (1937–2015), cardinal and Archbishop of Chicago (1997–2014)

Fictional characters
 Francis, in Spy Kids 3-D: Game Over
 Francis "Frank" Barone, in Everybody Loves Raymond
Francis Buxton, in the 1985 American adventure comedy film Pee-wee's Big Adventure
 Francis "Frank" Castle, from Marvel Comics, also known as the Punisher
Francis Mo Siu Wai 毛小慧, in 2000 Hong Kong's TVB sitcom War Of The Genders 男親女愛
 Francis the Talking Mule, featured in seven movies in the 1950s, voiced by Chill Wills
 Francis Underwood, from the Netflix original series House of Cards
 Francis Urquhart, lead character of the British political thriller House of Cards (UK TV series)
 Francis Abernathy, in Donna Tartt's 1992 novel The Secret History
 Francis, a bulldog in the 1988 Disney animated film Oliver & Company
 Francis, a ladybug in the 1998 Disney/Pixar animated film A Bug's Life
 Francis, Malcolm's oldest brother in Malcolm in the Middle
 Francis Xavier Cross, "Frank", Scrooge-like protagonist in the Christmas comedy Scrooged
 Francis Freeman, from Deadpool
 Francis E. Francis, from The Boss Baby
 Frank Gallagher, from the UK TV show Shameless
 Francis, a nerdy chameleon and one of the bosses in the video game Super Paper Mario
 Francis Xavier Reagan, "Frank," the current NYPD police commissioner in the TV series Blue Bloods
 Frank Drebin, from Police Squad
 Francis “Franco” Begbie, in the Trainspotting novel by Irvine Welsh
Fran Bow, a main protagonist in the game of the same name
Francis Butthurst Pope, a main character in the Big Nate comic strip
Purple Francis, a nonexistent protagonist of the Left 4 Dead video game franchise, created as an internet hoax

See also
 Francis (surname)
 Francis (disambiguation)

References

English-language masculine given names 
French masculine given names
English masculine given names